Quidhampton may refer to two places in England:
 Quidhampton, Hampshire
 Quidhampton, Wiltshire